Mount Washington station is a Baltimore Light Rail station in the Mt. Washington neighborhood of Baltimore, Maryland. The station has two side platforms serving two tracks.

History
The station was built in the location of the Mt. Washington station of the defunct Northern Central Railway. When the current stop opened in 1992, it had only a single track for trains traveling in either direction. A second track was added when the Light Rail's double-tracking project for this station was completed in 2005.

MTA buses do not serve the station directly due to narrow streets. Instead, they use a bus loop in Mt. Washington Village along Kelly Avenue, which was constructed in 1949 as a temporary layover for buses following the conversion from streetcars.

References

External links

Station from Google Maps Street View

1992 establishments in Maryland
Baltimore Light Rail stations
Mount Washington, Baltimore
Railway stations in Baltimore
Railway stations in the United States opened in 1992